Lynelle Jonsson is an American stage actress, dancer, and soprano singer.<ref name="nytimes">Feuer, Alan, "Still Smiling for the Troops, However Grim Their Mission", The New York Times, August 28, 2005.</ref> In 2004, and again in 2005, she was Miss USO and joined the Metropolitan New York USO Troupe of performers."USO Troupe performs at Fort Drum" , Fort Drum Blizzard Online (U.S. Army); September 16, 2004. She performed with the New York Gilbert and Sullivan Players and in other theatre and opera companies before concentrating, from 2010, in concert singing.

Stage actress and concert singer
Jonsson performed with New York Gilbert and Sullivan Players as ensemble cast member for eight years, usually at New York City Center.  Her credits with them include:
 The Pirates of Penzance, New York Gilbert and Sullivan Players Lynelle Jonsson with the USO Show Troupe of Metropolitan New York ; URL last accessed 2007-07-14.
 The Mikado New York Gilbert and Sullivan Players
 H.M.S. Pinafore, New York Gilbert and Sullivan Players

Her other stage acting credits include
 The Buddy Holly Story as Peggy Sue, with the Helen Hayes Theatre and Ogunquit Playhouse
 The Music Man playing Marian Paroo
 The Sound of Music playing Maria
 Così fan tutte playing Despina
 Lily's Crossing'' as Lily Monahan, with ArtsPower National Touring Theatre.

Concert credits include:
 More than 500 appearances as Miss USO and with the USO Troupe of Metropolitan New York.
 "Die Grosse Nacht der Filmmusik" Germany tour 2010 mit Aktiv Event Berlin
 "Tui Entertainment Mein Schiff" Klassischer Abend und Evening of Sondheim 2010/2011
 "Macy's Thanksgiving Day Parade on NBC" with United We Sing 2011
 "Pomp Duck and Circumstance" Stuttgart, Neu Ulm, Frankfurt, Berlin, Zurich 2011-2015
 "The 10 Sopranos" Germany tour 2012
 Birdland Jazz Series guest artist with Munich Swing Orchestra, AUDI forum. 2012, 2014.
 MS Europa, MS Europa 2 guest artist world tours 2012-2016.
 "Musicals in Concert" Over the Rainbow Show Productions, European Tour 2013-2017.
 "A Spectacular Night of Queen" European tour 2014-2015.

Notes and references

External links

 Official site of Lynelle Jonsson
 Jonsson's "Belters" parody

American women singers
American musical theatre actresses
Living people
Singers from New York City
Year of birth missing (living people)
Anderson University (Indiana) alumni
21st-century American women